Karydi (Greek: Καρύδι) may refer to several villages on Crete, Greece:

Karydi, Itanos, part of the municipality Itanos
Karydi, Ierapetra, part of the municipality Ierapetra
Karydi, Neapoli, part of the municipality Neapoli